The 2006 Dubai Duty Free Men’s Championships and Dubai Duty Free Women’s Championships was the 14th edition of this tennis tournament and was played on outdoor hard courts.  The tournament was part of the International Series Gold of the 2006 ATP Tour and the Tier II series of the 2006 WTA Tour. It took place in Dubai, United Arab Emirates from February 20 through March 4, 2006.

Champions

Men's singles

 Rafael Nadal defeated  Roger Federer, 2–6, 6–4, 6–4

Women's singles

 Justine Henin-Hardenne defeated  Maria Sharapova, 7–5, 6–2

Men's doubles

 Paul Hanley /  Kevin Ullyett defeated  Mark Knowles /  Daniel Nestor, 1–6, 6–2, [10–1]

Women's doubles

 Květa Peschke /  Francesca Schiavone defeated  Svetlana Kuznetsova /  Nadia Petrova, 3–6, 7–6, 6–3

External links
Official website
Association of Tennis Professionals (ATP) – tournament profile
WTA Profile

 
2006
Dubai
Dubai